Chasing Life is an American television drama series that aired on ABC Family from June 10, 2014, to September 28, 2015. The series is adapted from the Televisa Spanish-language Mexican television series Terminales. Ordered for 13 episodes, on November 27, 2013, an additional seven episodes were added to the series order, bringing the season to 20 episodes. On July 15, 2014, ABC Family ordered another episode to air as a Christmas special, bringing the episode order to 21.

On November 6, 2014, the series was renewed for a second season. Slated to premiere on August 17, 2015, the season two premiere was moved up to July 6.

Chasing Life was canceled on October 2, 2015.

Premise
Chasing Life  follows 24-year-old April, who is a smart and quick-witted aspiring journalist trying to advance her career at a Boston newspaper by impressing her hard-nosed editor. When not pursuing the latest scoop, April tries to balance her ambitious career with her family – her widowed mom Sara, rebellious little sister Brenna, and her sweet grandmother. Just as things start to look up at work, home, and on the romance front with co-worker Dominic, April finds out from an estranged uncle that she has leukemia.

Cast and characters

Main
 Italia Ricci as April Carver, a junior reporter at (the fictional) The Boston Post newspaper whose life takes a turn when she is diagnosed with leukemia. 
 Mary Page Keller as Sara Carver, April and Brenna's mother. She works as a therapist but her training has not helped her better relate to people outside the office.
 Richard Brancatisano as Dominic Russo, an arts reporter at The Boston Post and April's love interest. Breaks up with April after finding out she hadn't told him about cancer. Then, begins to date April's half-sister, Natalie but he doesn't commit to it, because he's clearly still in love with April.
 Haley Ramm as Brenna Carver, April's rebellious teenage sister, who went into a bad place after her father's death. In the midst of struggling with the changes in April's life, she starts dating popular classmate Greer, whose parents disapprove of her and forbid them from seeing each other. They date again briefly before breaking up due to Greer moving. In the Christmas special, Brenna came out as bisexual.
 Aisha Dee as Beth Kingston, April's best friend, who is the first person April tells about her cancer and April's most steadfast supporter.

Recurring
 Scott Michael Foster as Leo Hendrie, the son of a famous politician, who also has cancer. Also a love interest of April. Eventually asks April to marry him, and she says yes and they get married. Shortly after, he passes away in his sleep.
 Rebecca Schull as Emma, Sara's mother and April and Brenna's grandmother.
 Jessica Meraz as Natalie Ortiz, April and Brenna's paternal half-sister. She is younger than April, but older than Brenna. Thomas had an affair resulting with Natalie's birth many years ago, which only Sara and George knew about.
 Abhi Sinha as Danny Gupta, April's former co-worker turned friend.
 Steven Weber as Dr. George Carver, April and Brenna's paternal uncle, who has a romantic interest in Sara.
 Gracie Dzienny as Greer Danville, a popular girl from Brenna's school, who is Brenna's ex-girlfriend. She briefly lived with Brenna after a fallout with her parents before moving with her dad.
 Dylan Gelula as Ford, Brenna's best friend. They go through a rough patch when Brenna gets involved with Greer, but she is shown to be fiercely loyal.
 Merrin Dungey as Dr. Susan Hamburg, April's doctor.
 Shi Ne Nielson as Raquel Avila, April's supervisor turned rival
 Rob Kerkovich as Graham, Dominic's roommate and Beth's ex-boyfriend, whom she broke up with due to commitment issues.
 Augusto Aguilera as Kieran, Brenna's older ex-boyfriend who is also her boss at an art gallery/tattoo parlor.
 Alycia Grant as Meg, April's friend from her cancer support group. 
 Todd Waring as Bruce Hendrie, Leo's father and Massachusetts gubernatorial candidate.
 Andy Mientus as Jackson, a fellow cancer patient from April and Leo's cancer support group.
 Aurora Perrineau as Margo, Brenna's film club advisor, whom she briefly got romantically involved with
 Parker Mack as Finn Madill, a cancer patient who attends Brenna's new public school. Unbeknownst to the two of them, Brenna happens to also be Finn's bone marrow donor.  
 Vondie Curtis-Hall as Lawrence, April and Danny's boss at The Boston Post.
 Tom Irwin as Thomas Carver, April, Brenna and Natalie's father and George's brother. Known to the world as a famous novelist, his personal life remains a mystery that his daughters are trying to sort through.
 Stephen Schneider as Aaron Phillips, April and Danny's boss at The Boston Post, who replaced Lawrence.
 Bob Gebert as Dr. Stibler, Leo's doctor.

Episodes

Broadcast

Chasing Life premiered on June 10, 2014, running ten episodes out of an already ordered twenty. On July 15, 2014, an additional episode for the first season functioning as a Christmas special was ordered, and aired on December 9, 2014. The season returned on January 19, 2015. On November 6, 2014, Chasing Life was renewed for a second season. The second-season premiere in July 2015 and concluded in September 2015.

In Canada, the series premiered on ABC Spark on June 10, 2014.

In Australia, the series premiered on Fox8 on July 21, 2014, and returned for the second half of season one on February 3, 2015.

International broadcasting

Reception

Critical reception 
On the review aggregator website Rotten Tomatoes, the first season holds an approval rating of 75% based on 16 reviews, with an average rating of 7.30/10. The site's critics consensus reads, "Though the show would benefit from a sharper focus on its overall theme, Italia Ricci's believable leading performance makes Chasing Life worth following." On Metacritic, the first season of the show holds a score 59 out of 100 based on reviews from 12 critics, indicating "mixed or average reviews."

Ratings

Accolades

References

External links
 
 

2010s American drama television series
2014 American television series debuts
2015 American television series endings
English-language television shows
American television series based on telenovelas
Bisexuality-related television series
Lesbian-related television shows
Television series about journalism
Television series about cancer
Television shows set in Boston
Television series by Televisa
Television series by Lionsgate Television
Television series by Disney–ABC Domestic Television
ABC Family original programming
American television series based on Mexican television series
2010s American LGBT-related drama television series